Minerva Local School District is a rural public school district serving students in the tri-county area between Columbiana, Carroll, and Stark counties,  and the village of Minerva, also a part of Paris township. The district is made up of 3 schools located along the bustling U.S. Route 30. 

 Minerva Elementary (K-5) 850 students
 Minerva Middle (6-8) 450 students
 Minerva High (9-12) 600 students 

11th and 12th grade students also have the chance to go to R. G. Drage Career Center.

References

External links
 Official Site

School districts in Stark County, Ohio